School of Cinematography and Audiovisual of the Community of Madrid (ECAM) also sometimes referred to as "The Madrid Film School", is a film school located in , Pozuelo de Alarcón. In 2014,  joined the board of trustees.

It was admitted as a member of the International Association of Film and Television Schools in 1999.

It offers undergraduate, postgraduate, and other courses across all cinema and television disciplines.

In 2020 The Hollywood Reporter listed it among 'The Top 15 International Film Schools', featuring it as one of the world's fifteen most important film schools outside the USA. In 2019 and 2020, Madrid Film School teaching staff and alumni among them won twelve Goya Awards, Spanish cinema's highest honor.

Alumni

Some of its alumni have gained notoriety in a number of audiovisual fields, from screenwriting to art direction.

References 

Film schools in Spain
Education in the Community of Madrid
Pozuelo de Alarcón